The Braillettes were a vocal group from Alameda, California, United States. The group consisted of three women (Maggie Liebnitz, Jackie Overalls, and Kay Smith), two of whom (Overalls and Smith) were blind. They released one album, titled Our Hearts Keep Singing, in 1968. The album is now out of print.

The album cover for Our Hearts Keep Singing is often credited as one of the worst album covers of all time.

The cover photograph was taken by their high school classmate, John Skoglund, who later married Maggie Liebnitz.

"Our Hearts Keep Singing" and (alt-pop blues musician) Captain Beefheart's seminal "Trout Mask Replica" album were both recorded at Whitney Studios in Glendale during the same time period (1968–1969) – musician Frank Zappa's Hot Rats and other Zappa albums (as well as countless independently produced religious LPs) were also recorded at owner Loren Whitney's classic studio, which was known for its superlative Wurlitzer organ.

Our Hearts Keep Singing
Track listing:
"His Smile"
"The Innkeeper"
"How Rich I Am"
"Tenderly He Calls"
"This Is My Prayer"
"He'll Never Let You Fall"
"All Day Long My Heart Keeps Singing"
"The First Thing I Do Every Morning"
"That's What He Did For Me"
"Will He Know Me"
"Soon It Is Over"

References

Musical groups from California
American girl groups